Sekwitubulus annulatus is an Ediacaran tubular fossil from the Blueflower Formation in Canada.  Sekwitubulus is a monotypic genus, containing only the single species.  S. annulatus is possibly a type of annelid worm.  The name derives from the area the type specimen was found, Sekwi.

References

Ediacaran Northwest Territories
Fossils of Canada